Furedi is a Hungarian surname that may refer to
Ann Furedi (born 1960), British activist
Frank Furedi (born 1947), Hungarian-British sociologist, husband of Ann
Gábor Füredi (born 1944), Hungarian fencer
Lily Furedi (1896–1969), Hungarian-American artist
Vilmos Füredi (born 1947), Hungarian film director of photography and producer
Zoltán Füredi (born 1954), Hungarian mathematician

Hungarian-language surnames